Celebrate! is the twelfth studio album by American band Kool & the Gang. Released on September 29, 1980, the album reached No. 1 on the US R&B chart and #10 on the Billboard 200. The album produced perhaps Kool & the Gang's most recognizable hit song, the #1 chart-topper, "Celebration", which still receives heavy play today over four decades later.

Critical reception

Dennis Hunt of the Los Angeles Times called Celebration "the band's mostly excellent new album." Robert Christgau of the Village Voice gave a C- grade saying "It says something for these funk pioneers that unlike James Brown, George Clinton, and the Ohio Players they've adapted painlessly, nay profitably, to disco: a number-one single leads their Deodato-produced album into the top ten. What it says is that their funk was as bland as you suspected." With a 3 out of 5 stars review Amy Hanson of Allmusic found that "Celebrate itself marked the end of an era for Kool & the Gang, as the band would slip even farther from their funk roots and adopted dance grooves into the realms of smooth soul. But what a way to go!"

Record World said that the follow-up single to "Celebration", "Take It to the Top" was appropriately named and that it has "wonderful harmonies, vigorous strings & a snappy beat."

Track listing

Personnel
Bass – Robert "Kool" Bell
Lead guitar – Charles Smith
Keyboards, saxophone, backing vocals – Ronald Bell
Drums, percussion, backing vocals – George Brown
Lead and backing vocals – James "J.T." Taylor
Alto saxophone – Dennis Thomas
Trumpet, backing vocals – Robert Mickens
Keyboards, backing vocals – Earl Toon, Jr.
Keyboards – Kevin Bell
Additional keyboards – Adam Epolito
Backing vocals – Cedric Toon, Meekaeel Muhammad, Robert Bell, Coffee, Something Sweet
Orchestra arranged and conducted by – Eumir Deodato

Production
Recording engineer – Jim Bonnefond
Assistant engineers – Bobby Cohen, Clif Hodsdon, Jeff Kawalex, Joe DeAngelis, Jullian Robertson, Kenny Robb
Mixed by – Eumir Deodato, Jim Bonnefond, Gabe Vigorito
Mastered by – Tom Coyne
Producer – Eumir Deodato
Associate producer – Kool & The Gang
CD Mastering - Joe Gastwirt
CD Remastering - Joe Gastwirt

Certifications

References 

Kool & the Gang albums
1980 albums
De-Lite Records albums
Albums produced by Eumir Deodato